Ahmed El Amrani (born 16 February 1992) is a Norwegian footballer who currently plays for Hønefoss.

Career
He started his youth career in Lyn, and played one first-team game in 2010 following the team's bankruptcy and degradation to the seventh tier of Norwegian football.

In 2018 he played for the Veikkausliiga side FC Honka, and in 2019 he returned to Oslo and Skeid.

References

1992 births
Living people
Footballers from Oslo
Norwegian footballers
Norwegian expatriate footballers
Association football defenders
Skeid Fotball players
Superettan players
Eliteserien players
Ljungskile SK players
Stabæk Fotball players
Veikkausliiga players
FC Honka players
Hønefoss BK players
Expatriate footballers in Sweden
Norwegian expatriate sportspeople in Sweden
Expatriate footballers in Finland
Norwegian expatriate sportspeople in Finland